Leonard Knight: A Man & His Mountain is a 2015 documentary film directed by Andrew Blake Doyle, about the life and message of American outsider artist Leonard Knight and his visionary environment known as Salvation Mountain.

Synopsis

Salvation Mountain is a huge piece of artwork  made of adobe, straw, auto parts and a tangle of trees covered with thousands of cans of paint.
It encompasses numerous murals and areas painted with Christian sayings and Bible verses, though its philosophy was built around the Sinner's Prayer.

Focused around Leonard Knight and Salvation Mountain's simple message of "God Is Love", the film follows Knight's thirty year journey and his convicted dedication to spread that message. Hosted by actress Julianna Barninger, the documentary starts from the premise of asking the question: "If you had something to say to the world, how would you do it?"

The film presents Knight's initial idea and failed attempt of making a hot-air balloon with the "God Is Love" message on the side of it; through the creation of Salvation Mountain; and concludes with footage of Knight's funeral and his memorial service held at the mountain. As the film progresses through Knight's life and his desire to spread his message, it uses a series of "man on the street" interviews interspersed throughout the film to pose questions and explore larger concepts on God and love.

The documentary features interviews with a number of people, including Knight himself; caretakers Kevin Eubank and Mike Phippen; and photojournalist Aaron Huey. This film includes one of Knight's final interviews; one of caretaker Kevin Eubank's final interviews; and a walk-thru tour of Salvation Mountain given by Knight himself.

Production

The film was released in November 2015 with screenings at Salvation Mountain and various churches, with future film festival screenings planned for 2016. Released in association with the Salvation Mountain Board of Directors, a portion of the film's proceeds – $4 from every purchase – is earmarked for the preservation of Salvation Mountain.

The original working title for the production was A Man and His Mountain: The Story of Leonard Knight.

References

External links
 
 Leonard Knight: A Man & His Mountain at A2D2 Films
 Trailer for Leonard Knight: A Man & His Mountain at You Tube

Documentary films about visual artists
American documentary films
2015 films
2010s English-language films
2010s American films